Chocolate Glacier is located on east slopes of Glacier Peak in the U.S. state of Washington. As is true with all the glaciers found on Glacier Peak, Chocolate Glacier is retreating. Chocolate Glacier has resumed retreating since and has given back , nearing its previously recorded minimal length. The current terminus at 1800 m is still the lowest of the east side glacier. Chocolate Glacier remains heavily crevassed and active to 1900 m. The lowest 300 m of the glacier are stagnant.

See also
List of glaciers in the United States

References

Glaciers of Glacier Peak
Glaciers of Washington (state)